The Lexington and Ohio Railroad was the first railroad in the U.S. Commonwealth of Kentucky. Its charter proposed the establishment of a link between Lexington in the center of the Bluegrass Region to the river port of Louisville at the Falls of the Ohio by way of Frankfort, the state capital. The line was never completed and the Panic of 1837 led to its complete collapse. The Commonwealth seized the railroad in payment of its debts in 1840.

The rights-of-way of the former L&O were later purchased and utilized by the Louisville & Frankfort and Lexington & Frankfort railroads, which subsequently merged into the Louisville, Cincinnati and Lexington Railroad.

See also
 Louisville and Frankfort Railroad
 Midway, Kentucky
 Midway Historic District (Midway, Kentucky)

References

Defunct Kentucky railroads
Predecessors of the Louisville and Nashville Railroad
Railway companies established in 1830
Railway companies disestablished in 1842
Transportation in Louisville, Kentucky
1830 establishments in Kentucky
American companies established in 1830
American companies disestablished in 1842